Spermadictyon is a genus of flowering plants belonging to the family Rubiaceae.

Its native range is Indian subcontinent.

Species
Species:
 Spermadictyon suaveolens Roxb.

References

Rubiaceae
Rubiaceae genera